Kamenica or Dardana, or Kosovska Kamenica (Serbian Cyrillic: Косовска Каменица), is a town and municipality located in the Gjilan District of Kosovo. According to the 2011 census, the town of Kamenica has 7,331 inhabitants, while the municipality has 36,085 inhabitants.

History
Kamenica always had better than average inter-ethnic relations during the Yugoslav era. Tensions today are low because there was less violence than elsewhere during the Kosovo War.

Demographics 

According to the 2011 census results, the municipality of Kamenica has 36,085 inhabitants.

Ethnic groups
The ethnic composition of the municipality:

Villages
Dashnicë
Zhujë

See also 
 Municipalities of Kosovo
 Cities and towns in Kosovo
 Populated places in Kosovo
 Church of the Holy Apostles, Petrovac
Dardana Fortress

References

External links 

 Multicipality of Kosovska Kamenica
 SOK Kosovo and its population
 Kosova Kamenica Info (In Serbian)
 Kosovo’s youngest mayor seeks to bridge ethnic divide, Financial Times

 
Kosovo–Serbia border crossings
Municipalities of Kosovo
Cities in Kosovo